Living the Dream is a British comedy drama series that first aired on 2 November 2017 on Sky One. The series centres around the Pemberton family, who move from Yorkshire to Florida.

Cast

 Philip Glenister as Mal Pemberton
 Lesley Sharp as Jen Pemberton
 Rosie Day as Tina Pemberton
 Brenock O'Connor as Freddie Pemberton
 Leslie Jordan as Aiden
 Paula Wilcox as Maureen
 Kevin Nash as Troy
 Michael Ray Davis as Pastor William
 John Crosby as Ryan
 Regina Curtin as Dorothy
 Kim Fields as Rhoda
 Randy Havens as Casper
 Jimmy Akingbola as Paul
 Skylar McNamee as Conan Bloch
 David de Vries as Herman Bloch
 Jane McNeill as Larissa Bloch
 Jonathan Jude as Dylan Campbell

Episodes

Series 1 (2017)

Series 2 (2019)

References

External links

2017 British television series debuts
2019 British television series endings
2010s British comedy-drama television series
English-language television shows
Sky UK original programming
Television shows set in England
Television shows set in Florida
Television series by Big Talk Productions
Television series by ITV Studios